Associated may refer to:
Associated, former name of Avon, Contra Costa County, California
Associated Hebrew Schools of Toronto, a school in Canada
Associated Newspapers, former name of DMG Media, a British publishing company

See also
Association (disambiguation)
Associate (disambiguation)